Merkl is a German language surname and a variant of Merkel. It stems from a reduced form of the male given name Marcus. Notable people with the name include:

Gerhard Merkl (1961–2016), German choral conductor
Rudolf von Merkl (1831–1911), Austro-Hungarian general
Willy Merkl (1900–1934), German mountain climber
 Peter H Merkl (born 1932), German political scientist PhD 
 John Merkl (born 1965), American photographer

References 

German-language surnames
Surnames from given names